Long Island Care at Home, Ltd. v. Coke, 551 U.S. 158 (2007), is a US labor law case, concerning the minimum wage.

Facts
Long Island Care at Home Ltd claimed that it did not need to pay its staff the minimum wage, despite the apparent meaning of the Fair Labor Standards Act of 1938 and its rules as clarified by the Department of Labor. It argued that this was true under the Fair Labor Standards Act 1938, 29 USC §213(a)(15) which exempted persons ‘employed in domestic service employment to provide companionship services for individuals … unable to care for themselves.’ The Department of Labor's General Regulations §552.3 further stated this had to be the ‘private home … of the person by whom he or she is employed.’

Judgment
Justice Breyer wrote for a unanimous court that the care employees were included in the minimum wage.

See also

United States labor law

References

External links
 

United States labor case law
United States Supreme Court cases
United States Supreme Court cases of the Roberts Court
2007 in United States case law